Johann Sebastian Bach composed the church cantata  (Lord Christ, the only Son of God), 96, in Leipzig for the 18th Sunday after Trinity and first performed it on 8 October 1724.

The hymn, related to mysticism and comparing Jesus to the Morning star, matches two aspects of the prescribed gospel for the Sunday, the Great Commandment and a theological dispute about the term "Son of David". An unknown poet kept the first and last stanza for the first and last movement of the cantata, and paraphrased the inner stanzas as four movements, alternating recitative and aria. Bach set the first stanza as a chorale fantasia with the cantus firmus in the alto, adding sparkle by a "dancing" soprano and the illumination of a sopranino, which he used for the first time in his cantatas. In the four inner movements, all four vocal parts have their solo. A tenor aria is accompanied by an obbligato transverse flute, a part written for a virtuoso player. A bass aria is accompanied by an oboe and strings, acting as in a Venetian concerto. The cantata is closed with a simple four-part setting of the hymn tune. Bach performed the cantata again in later years, with minor changes to the scoring.

History and text 
Bach wrote the cantata in 1724 for the 18th Sunday after Trinity as part of his second annual cycle of mostly chorale cantatas. The prescribed readings for the Sunday were from the First Epistle to the Corinthians, Paul's thanks for grace of God in Ephesus, and from the Gospel of Matthew, the Great Commandment, also mentioning that the byname "Son of David" was discussed in a "theological dispute" of Jesus and the pharisees.

The cantata text of an unknown author is based exclusively on the hymn "" in five stanzas by Elisabeth Cruciger (1524). The hymn is based on a Latin Christmas hymn, "Corde natus ex parentis", by Aurelius Prudentius. It is the first hymn by a Lutheran reformer which continues late medieval mysticism. Martin Luther appreciated the hymn so much that he placed it at the beginning of an early hymnal, . The chorale was originally associated with Epiphany, but also with the 18th Sunday after Trinity.

The hymn's first and last stanza in their original wording became the outer movements, as usual in Bach's chorale cantatas. The unknown librettist paraphrased stanzas 2 and 3 to the cantata's respective movements, and stanza 4 to movements 4 and 5. The hymn tries to answer this question, comparing Jesus to the Morning star, an image also used in the hymn "", the base for Bach's cantata .

Bach performed the cantata at least three times, first on 8 October 1724, a second time probably on 24 October 1734 when the sopranino was replaced by a violino piccolo, and a third time probably on 1 October 1740. The Bach scholar Christoph Wolff suggested performances in 1744/47, Klaus Hofmann in 1747, when the corno part was given to a trombone.

Music

Structure and scoring 
Bach structured the cantata in six movements, framing alternating recitatives and arias by an opening chorale fantasia and a closing four-part chorale. He scored it for soprano, alto, tenor and bass soloists, a four-part choir, and an ensemble of Baroque instruments: horn (Co) or (later) trombone to enforce the hymn tune, flauto traverso (Ft), flauto piccolo (Fp) or (later) violino piccolo, two oboes (Ob), two violins (Vl), viola (Va), cello (Vc), and basso continuo. The title page of the autograph score reads: "Concerto. / Dominica 18. post. Trinit: / Herr Christ der einge Gottes Sohn etc. / a / Traversiere / 2 Hautbois / 2 Violini / Viola / Canto / Alto / Tenore / Basso / e / Continuo. / d. J.S. Bach".

In the following table of the movements, the scoring follows the Neue Bach-Ausgabe. The keys and time signatures are taken from Alfred Dürr, using the symbol for common time (4/4). The continuo, playing throughout, is not shown.

Movements

1 
As in most cantatas of the second cycle, Bach set the opening chorus on the first stanza of the hymn in its original wording, "" (Lord Christ, only Son of God), as chorale fantasia. He assigned the cantus firmus to the alto, enforced by a horn (in later performance replaced by trombone). Bach had used a cantus firmus in the alto already in his chorale cantata , for the second Sunday after Trinity. In , this leaves the sopranos free, as the musicologist Julian Mincham notes, "to dance their own hymn of joy in the upper register above the chorale tune, thus lightening the texture and mood of the entire chorus". An unusual flauto piccolo or sopranino recorder is used to illustrate the sparkling of the morning star. Hofmann notes that it was Bach's first use of a sopranino in a cantata, and the first introduction of his Leipzig audience to the instrument which had not been used as a concert instrument. In a later performance (probably 1734) it was replaced by a violino piccolo. The choral setting is polyphonic in the three other voices and embedded in instrumental music based on similar motifs.

2 
The first recitative for alto, "" (O wondrous power of love), is secco, only accompanied by the continuo. It refers to Jesus as descendant of David and son of Mary, reflecting the Virgin birth. John Eliot Gardiner, who conducted in 2000 the Bach Cantata Pilgrimage and performed this cantata in Leipzig's Thomaskirche, notes that the cantata's two recitatives are "exemplary even by Bach's standards in their economy of means and richness of expression. Mincham notes that a "flowing bass line" is heard when one line is quoted from the hymn, referring to "the end of earthly time".

3 
The tenor aria, "" (Ah, draw my soul with skeins of love), is accompanied by the transverse flute, probably played by the flauto piccolo player of the first movement. Some musicologists think that he was Friedrich Gottlieb Wild, a law student.

4 
The recitative for soprano, "" (Ah, lead me, o God, to the right path), is a prayer for God's guidance.

5 
The bass aria illustrates the words "" (Soon to the right, soon to the left my erring steps leaned) in jagged motifs and a frequent switch between winds and strings. In the middle section steady steps picture "" (Yet go with me, my Savior). The final part combines both elements. Gardiner notes that Bach uses the winds and strings in concerting choirs (cori spezzati), enforced by positioning them on galleries, one of them right, the other left of the singers. The technique had been practised in Venice in the late sixteenth century and introduced in Germany by composers such as Heinrich Schütz who studied in Venice. Gardiner observes also a hint at the style of French opera which Bach may have heard, traveling as a boy in northern Germany, at the Hamburg opera, in Celle or Lüneburg.

6 
The closing chorale,"" (Kill us through your goodness), is a four-part setting for the choir, horn, oboes and strings playing colla parte with the voices.

Recordings 
The entries are taken from the listing on Bach Cantatas Website. Instrumental groups playing period instruments in historically informed performances are marked green under the header Instr..

References

Sources 

 
 Herr Christ, der einge Gottessohn BWV 96; BC A 142 / Chorale cantata (18th Sunday after Trinity) Bach Digital
 BWV 96 Herr Christ, der einge Gottessohn English translation, University of Vermont
 Luke Dahn: BWV 96.6 bach-chorales.com

Church cantatas by Johann Sebastian Bach
1724 compositions
Chorale cantatas